Gavy NJ (Korean: 가비엔제이) is a South Korean pop ballad female trio that debuted in 2005. The trio currently composed of Jenny, Gunji and Seorin. Member Hyemin official departed from the group in 2009 while Heeyoung in 2011, Misty in 2012 and Sihyun in 2016.

In 2006 Gavy NJ was included on the Goodberry Entertainment (their former label) 7 members project group "Gavy NJ Project Group H7 Miin", renamed to "H7 Miin Project The b" in 2010.

In early 2009, original member Jung Hye Min left the group and was replaced by Misty. On November 17, 2011 it was announced that original member Hee Young would leave the group after finishing the promotion of the digital single "Gaseyo". In April 2012, it was announced that Misty had also left and replacement by addition two new members for the group. Original member Sihyun official left from the group after her contract had expired in 2016 and was replaced by Seorin.

Members

Current
 Jenny (제니)
 Gunji (건지)
 Seorin (서린)

Former
Hyemin (혜민)
Heeyoung (희영)
Misty (미스티)
Sihyeon (시현)

Timeline

Discography

Studio albums

Compilation albums

Extended plays

Singles

Collaborations

Soundtrack appearances

Notes

References

K-pop music groups
South Korean girl groups
Musical groups from Seoul
2005 establishments in South Korea
Musical groups established in 2005